A concrete saw (also known as a consaw, road saw, cut-off saw, slab saw or quick cut) is a power tool used for cutting concrete, masonry, brick, asphalt, tile, and other solid materials. There are many types ranging from small hand-held saws, chop-saw models, and big walk-behind saws or other styles, and it may be powered by gasoline, hydraulic or pneumatic pressure, or an electric motor. The saw blades used on concrete saws are often diamond saw blades to cut concrete, asphalt, stone, etc. Abrasive cut-off wheels can also be used on cut-off saws to cut stone and steel. The significant friction generated in cutting hard substances like concrete usually requires the blades to be cooled to prolong their life and reduce dust.

Blade choice
Choosing a proper diamond saw blade for the concrete saw is a necessary condition to perform a cutting task well. Apart from some basic aspects, for example, what diameters of diamond saw blades the concrete saw can accommodate, its arbor size and the blade's quality, there are some other important aspects which should also be considered:

 The match between the diamond saw blade's features and the concrete/asphalt's type. For example, some concretes have steel bars in them (reinforced concrete) and some do not have. Some concretes' stone aggregate is pebbles and some is crushed rocks. Some concretes' curing time is long (cured concrete) and some is short (green concrete). The diamond saw blades should have different design to fit these concrete and asphalt.
Wet or dry cutting. Though diamond saw blades for concrete are usually laser welded, they are normally designed for wet cutting because the concrete to be cut is often very hard or abrasive. If the blades are used without adequate water, the diamond segment itself may break or the steel core below the segment may wear and break, and then the segment may fly out and may hurt the operator or people nearby. If you have to perform dry cutting for some reason (e.g. there is no water source near your work area), you can choose sharper diamond blades, and the dry cutting should be intermittent and shallow (you can do several passes of shallow cuttings to gain a deep cut) to keep the diamond blade cool.
 Whether faster cutting or longer lifespan is needed. The basic cutting speed of the diamond saw blades should be first determined. On this basis, a blade which has a faster cutting speed or a longer lifespan can be selected.
The power output of the concrete saw. If the concrete saw has a high power output, the diamonds on the saw blade will receive a higher impact when cutting is performed. In this case, the diamond concentration of the diamond saw blade should be higher, or its bond should be harder. Whilst if the saw has a low power output, the diamond concentration should be lower or the bond should be softer to make the blade become sharper to ensure the cutting speed needed.

Dust control

Stones, rocks, sands and clays can contain large amounts of crystalline silica and are used to make kerbs, flags, bricks, tiles and concrete. Cutting these materials produces airborne dust containing very fine respirable crystalline silica (RCS) particles. These particles are small and it is not always possible to see the RCS dust in normal lighting.

Serious health effects, such as lung cancer or silicosis, can result from exposure to RCS. This is because fine RCS particles can penetrate deep into the lungs.

There are following ways to reduce or control the dust:

 Wet cutting with adequate water supply.
 If possible, diamond saw blades should be used instead of abrasive saw blades to cut. Diamond saw blades normally cut more quickly than abrasive blades while requiring less water.
 The concrete saw should have a local exhaust ventilation (LEV) system, which can capture the majority of dust emitted during the cutting operation.
 When operating, the operator should always wear personal protective equipment (PPE).

There are some other risks during the cutting process which will also need to be controlled to protect the operator and the passers-by, for example, noise, flying debris, hand-arm vibration, manual handling, electricity and refueling.

See also
 Diamond tools
 Diamond blade

References

Saws